In psychoanalysis, cathexis is defined as the process of investment of mental or emotional energy in a person, object, or idea.

Cathexis may also refer to:
Cathexis (beetle), a genus of longhorn beetles
Cathexis (Star Trek: Voyager), the 12th episode of Star Trek: Voyager
Cathexis (comics), a race of sixth-dimensional beings from the DC Universe
Cathexis (Typeface), a Typeface (font) designed by Jason Walcott as part of the Jukebox Font library.